Events from 2020 in Kiribati.

Incumbents 

 President: Taneti Maamau
 Vice President: Teuea Toatu

Events 
Ongoing – COVID-19 pandemic in Oceania

 1 February – The government put all visas from China on hold and required new arrivals to fill in a health form and travellers from countries with COVID-19 to go through a self-quarantine period.
 28 March – Despite not having any cases, President Taneti Maamau declared a state of emergency.
 10 September – The government announced it will keep the borders closed until the end of the year to keep the country free of the virus. Exceptions include repatriations, humanitarian flights, and the transport of essential supplies into the country. A group of 20 I-Kiribati people in the Marshall Islands are the first set to be repatriated.
 14 September – It was announced that President Taneti Maamau and the leaders of Palau, Nauru, the Federated States of Micronesia and the Marshall Islands will be hosting an in-person meeting. President of Nauru Lionel Aingimea said the leaders agreed to attend Palau's Independence Day on October 1 as the five Pacific countries remain free of COVID-19.

Deaths

References 

2020 in Kiribati
2020s in Kiribati
Years of the 21st century in Kiribati
Kiribati
Kiribati